His Late Excellency is a 1935 German historical comedy film directed by Hans H. Zerlett and starring Arthur Schroder, Rose Vollborn, and Hansjoachim Büttner. Following the death of the ruler of a German principality in the nineteenth century, intrigue breaks out in the struggle to succeed him.

The film's sets were designed by the art directors Kurt Dürnhöfer and Otto Moldenhauer.

Cast

References

Bibliography

External links 
 

1935 films
1930s historical comedy films
German historical comedy films
Films of Nazi Germany
1930s German-language films
Films directed by Hans H. Zerlett
Films set in the 19th century
German films based on plays
Remakes of German films
Sound film remakes of silent films
German black-and-white films
1930s German films